is a Japanese fairy tale translated by Lafcadio Hearn, published in 1898, as number 23 of Hasegawa Takejirō's Japanese Fairy Tale Series. It was later included in Hearn's Japanese Fairy Tales. 

The original title in Hearn's manuscript was "The Artist of Cats". Printing it on plain paper as in the rest of the series did not meet with Hearn's approval, and this book became the first of a five-volume set by Hearn printed on crepe paper. Illustrations were by the artist .

Synopsis

In a small village lived a farmer and his wife, described as decent folk. They have many children who are capable farm-hands, except for the youngest son who is intelligent but small and frail, and not suited for hard work. The parents decide the boy would be better off he became a priest, and he is accepted as an acolyte in training under the old priest of the village temple. Although the boy excelled as a student, he had the irresistible habit of drawing cats everywhere, including the margins of books, the temple's pillars, and all its screens, and is expelled. The priest warns the boy: "Avoid large places at night. Keep to the small".

The boy did not want to return to his father's farm for fear of punishment, and instead, he travels to the temple in the neighboring village, twelve miles away, hoping to be admitted as an acolyte there, not realizing all the priests living there have long-ago been driven away by a giant goblin-rat, and a number of warriors have gone missing after attempting to eradicate the goblin at night. The boy enters the deserted temple, which is dusty and cobwebbed. But he finds many big white screens to draw on, and finding a writing box (containing a brush), he ground some ink (i.e., ground inkstick on an inkstone), and drew cats on them.

Feeling drowsy, he was about to lie down to sleep by the screens, but recalls the old priest's words and climbs inside a little cabinet to go to sleep. During the night he hears horrible sounds of screaming and fighting. When morning comes and he finally climbs out, he discovers the corpse of the goblin-rat.
As he wonders what could have killed it, he notices that all his cats now have blood on their mouths. He is hailed as a hero for defeating the monster, and grows up to be a famous artist.

Origin

This tale was known from Tohoku to Chugoku and Shikoku regions under the title . Some commentators trace the tale to the 15th century legends around Sesshū.

It has been suggested that Lafcadio Hearn's version is a retelling, and has no original Japanese story which is an "exact counterpart". Thus "in his English edition, Lafcadio Hearn retold it with a thrilling ghostly touch. In the original story, the acolyte becomes the abbot of the temple after the incident, but in Hearn's version, he goes on to be a renowned artist".

Analyses
The legends surrounding the eminent inkbrush artist priest Sesshū as a young acolyte has been compared to this folktale, and it has been suggested the tale may derive from the legends around young Sesshū.

Hearn stipulated that he would not contribute a story unless it would be "prettily illustrated" in publication, and even though the choice of artist was not the author/translator's,  drawing catered to the American readers' taste for the fantastical, as in the example of the illustration showing the dead giant rat-ghoul.

The tale is displayed as the second of 51 tales in the 1960 book, All Cats go to Heaven.

Explanatory notes

References
Citations

Bibliography

External links
 Audio recording of "The Boy Who Drew Cats" - Downloadable and streaming audio formats.

Japanese fairy tales
Books about cats